T. J. Ramini is a British actor known for his role as DC Zain Nadir in The Bill and Tarin Faroush in 24.

Career
Ramini's other parts include guest appearances in the television series Casualty, The Inspector Lynley Mysteries, 24 and NCIS, as well as the film Batman Begins (2005). He guest-starred in Boston Legal as a prisoner who is wrongfully detained and tortured at Guantanamo Bay, and in Desperate Housewives as Yaniv (in the episode "Mama Spent Money When She Had None"). In 2017 he starred in Prison Break, and later appeared in an episode of the American political drama Designated Survivor.

Filmography

Film

Television

Video games

External links
 

20th-century British male actors
21st-century British male actors
British male film actors
British male television actors
British male video game actors
British male voice actors
Living people
Year of birth missing (living people)
Place of birth missing (living people)